Streptomyces dysideae is a Gram-positive bacterium species from the genus of Streptomyces which has been isolated from the sponge Dysidea tupha from Rovinj.

See also 
 List of Streptomyces species

References 

dysideae
Bacteria described in 2021